USS Rochester has been the name of many ships of the United States Navy.  All of the ships are named for the city of Rochester, New York.

, was renamed and redesignated to Rochester (CA-2).
, was originally laid down as Rochester, but was renamed prior to being launched.
, an  heavy cruiser

United States Navy ship names